Ayman Mohamed Fayez or Ayman Alaa Eldin Mohamed Fayez (born 3 March 1991 Giza, Egypt) is an Egyptian fencer who competed in the 2012 Olympics and 2016 Olympics in Men's Individual Épée.

Fayez was African champion in 2009, 2012 and 2017, also winning gold in the team epee event on all three occasions.  In 2008, 2013 and 2015, he won a bronze medal in the individual event and a gold medal in the team event at the African Championships.  In 2016, he won a silver medal in the individual and a gold medal in the men's team epee at the African Championships, replicating his results from the 2011 and 2014 African Championships.

References

Egyptian male épée fencers
Living people
Olympic fencers of Egypt
Fencers at the 2012 Summer Olympics
Fencers at the 2016 Summer Olympics
1991 births
African Games silver medalists for Egypt
African Games medalists in fencing
Competitors at the 2015 African Games
21st-century Egyptian people